Peruvia is a genus of South American grasshoppers comprising two species: 
Peruvia jagoi Cadena-Castañeda & Cardona, 2015
Peruvia nigromarginata (Scudder, 1875)

References

Gomphocerinae
Acrididae genera